Tut is a village in Nakodar in Jalandhar district of Punjab State, India. The village is administrated by a sarpanch who is an elected representative of village as per Panchayati raj (India).

Demography 
As of 2011, The village has a total number of 334 houses and population of 1549 of which include 739 are males while 810 are females according to the report published by Census India in 2011. Literacy rate of the village is 77.19%, higher than state average of 75.84%. The population of children under the age of 6 years is 155 which is 10.01% of total population of the village, and child sex ratio is approximately 938 higher than the state average of 846.

Most of the people are from Schedule Caste which constitutes 36.15% of total population in the village. The town does not have any Schedule Tribe population so far.

As per census 2011, 450 people were engaged in work activities out of the total population of the village which includes 399 males and 51 females. According to census survey report 2011, 82.44% workers describe their work as main work and 17.56% workers are involved in marginal activity providing livelihood for less than 6 months.

Transport 
Nakodar railway station is the nearest train station.

References 

Villages in Jalandhar district